The United Counties of Stormont, Dundas and Glengarry (SDG) is an upper-tier municipality in the Canadian province of Ontario that comprises three historical counties and excludes the City of Cornwall and the Mohawk Nation of Akwesasne. However, both Cornwall and Akwesasne form part of a larger census division named for the United Counties of Stormont, Dundas and Glengarry. The municipality's administrative office is located within Cornwall.

The United Counties of SDG borders Quebec to the east and New York in the United States to the south. The sovereign Mohawk Nation of Akwesasne straddles both borders, thus including territory partly within Ontario, Quebec and New York.

History
[[File:Plaque Stormont Dundas Glengarry Highlanders Bernières Calvados, France.jpg|thumb|Plaque to the SDG Highlanders heroes at ‘‘Juno Beach, Calvados, Normandy, France.]]
The area along the Saint Lawrence River had been settled by indigenous peoples for thousands of years.  About 2,000 years ago, the Point Peninsula complex people built earthen mounds, such as those at Serpent Mounds Park and Cameron's Point.  They were gradually replaced about 1000–1300 AD by the Owasco people, who had migrated northward.  They practised a more settled form of agriculture.

These people are believed to have developed into the Iroquoian-speaking people, of which the St. Lawrence Iroquoians are identified as having settled along the river valley of the same name.  They spoke Laurentian, practised agriculture, and built fortified villages, such as those visited and described by explorer Jacques Cartier.  They were a group distinct from the Iroquois Five Nations based in present-day New York.  Historians believe the Mohawk Iroquois pushed out or destroyed the St. Lawrence Iroquoians by 1600 and used the uninhabited territory as a hunting and trapping ground.  In the 17th and early 18th century, some settled at Kahnawake, south of Montreal.

In the late 1750s, some 30 Mohawk families who had converted to Christianity, who had previously lived at Kahnawake, founded Akwesasne further West (upriver) in what would become Ontario. As of 2019, Akwesasne was the largest Mohawk territory in Canada, with a population of about 12,000 people.

Though accounts suggest Europeans filtered into the area and had lived in poorly documented, unofficial and widely scattered settlements for some time, the first formally documented European settlement was established in 1784 by United Empire Loyalists, primarily from the former British colony of New York.  After the war for American independence, former colonial soldiers loyal to the Crown and other disbanded soldiers and their families began to settle at the site of Cornwall, then called New Johnstown. Many of the new arrivals were of German origin, with the town being named for Johnstown, New York where many came from.

The main group were led by Lieutenant-Colonel Sir John Johnson and were soldiers from the First Battalion King's Royal Regiment of New York and a contingent of the 84th Royal Highland Emigrants.  Following the success of rebellious colonists in the American Revolution, many of those afraid for their lives or uncomfortable in the newly independent United States would become "United Empire Loyalists", as they were later called, and migrated to Canada.  The British government helped them settle throughout the Canadas as a reward for their loyalty and to compensate them for their losses in the United States. One of the chief settlement regions was the St Lawrence River valley, from Kingston to Cornwall, which would later be known as "loyalist country".

They founded a settlement on the site formerly called Pointe Maligne by French colonists and renamed it "Royal Settlement #2", and, later, "New Johnstown".  It was later renamed Cornwall by the British for the Duke of Cornwall by proclamation of Prince George, and in 1834 the town became one of the first incorporated municipalities in the British colony of Upper Canada.  The construction of the Cornwall Canal between 1834 and 1842 accelerated the community's development into a regional and industrial economic "capital" for a growing hinterland of towns and villages.

The united counties comprises six of the original eight Royal Townships of Upper Canada: Lancaster, Charlottenburgh, Cornwall, Osnabruck, Williamsburgh and Matilda. These six townships were divided into 12 a few years after their creation. Each set of four townships became one of three separate counties: Lancaster, Charlottenburgh, Kenyon and Lochiel became Glengarry County, Cornwall, Osnabruck, Finch and Roxborough became Stormont County, and Williamsburgh, Matilda, Winchester and Mountain became Dundas County. The three counties were later amalgamated to form the United Counties of Stormont, Dundas and Glengarry.

In 1846, the population of Cornwall was about 1,600 and there were many brick and stone houses as well as a stone courthouse and jail, but the surrounding region contained a large number of towns that had grown from what were, originally, quite isolated settlements. Several government offices were located in Cornwall, but there was little industry, except for a foundry and two tanneries. However, many independent tradesmen of various types worked in the "city" and in the surrounding counties. Other town-based amenities in Cornwall included two bank agencies, eight taverns and a ladies' school. 
 
Canal and lock construction in the late 1800s and early 1900s brought work and international business.  Railway connections, beginning in the 1850s, provided connections between Cornwall and local communities in the counties that required access to public services in Cornwall itself, such as high schools and medical services, and helped cement Cornwall's position as a regional centre for a large, rapidly expanding and increasingly populated rural hinterland . The network of villages and towns surrounding Cornwall helped make the city a local entrepot for business, commerce, media and services, and the development of communication and travel networks turned what was originally a series of isolated towns into a cohesive economic and social region.

Situated on the southern border of the counties along the St. Lawrence River, west of Cornwall, were several smaller communities that no longer exist.  Now known as the Lost Villages, the communities were permanently flooded in 1958 during the construction of the St. Lawrence Seaway as the massive Moses-Saunders Power Dam at the western end of the city required a reservoir. The villages were flooded when it was filled. Much of the Cornwall region's local character also changed at this time.

Ethnic history

Despite being a rural area, the United Counties have had a remarkably complex cultural history. Because of the usefulness of the St Lawrence river valley for transportation and the region's general fertility and access to water, the river basin is a natural corridor for people and goods, migration and conquest, and many groups who have traveled through have also settled there.

Prior to European colonization, the Mohawks and Six Nations Iroquois settled, raided and battled through the St. Lawrence valley.  The French and British fought over the waterway, often both using and being used by native allies in highly complex economic and political competition. During the War of 1812, a generation after thirteen of the British colonies declared independence and became the United States,  the region became a battleground between Americans and the people who would become today's Canadians.  Formally founded under colonial British control to be a new home for refugees from the American Revolution, it remained a home for refugees and migrants for much of its history.

Early settlement of the region is largely undocumented, although oral histories and early accounts suggest that European settlers, traders and farmers lived in the area long before formal state recognition, and had been interacting with and/or mixing with the native population for most of that time.

The post-contact regional population was a mixture of French Canadian, Ojibwe and Mohawk residents.  To this mix was added an influx of American English Loyalists and refugees from the Thirteen Colonies (now the United States), other French Canadian and Acadian migrants and, later, poor Scottish and Irish immigrants and refugees who arrived from overseas and from other parts of Canada.  These different groups mixed and integrated over time, with family names and histories reflecting a blending of different backgrounds that became typical of Eastern Ontario.

Smaller but nevertheless impressive contributions in the region were made by a host of other migrants, from Jewish traders, craftsmen and merchants, to Eastern European refugees and even a significant body of former slaves.  Many of these stories go unreported in standard histories, which pass over the remarkable history of migration in the region.  One good example is the story of John Baker who died in Cornwall in 1871 at the age of 93.  Born in Lower Canada, he was said to be the last Canadian born into slavery, and had been an active soldier in the War of 1812, fighting in both Canada and Europe.  Slavery was ended in the colony of Upper Canada in stages, beginning in 1793 when importing slaves was banned, and culminating in 1819 when Upper Canada Attorney-General John Robinson declared all slaves in the colony to be freed, making Upper Canada the first place in the British Empire - and, in fact, the world - to unequivocally move towards formal abolition of chattel slavery.  Most of these former slaves settled and integrated into the same communities where they were freed.  By 1833, this process of liberation had succeeded throughout the Empire and all slaves in the British Empire were free. The British Empire was the first major state in world history to abolish slavery, and Ontario was the place where this process first bore fruit.  John Baker, the last slave to be born into slavery in Canada, died in Cornwall.Abolition of slavery timeline

"Canada" had been stripped from France after the Seven Years' War, and this included roughly the areas now covered by the Canadian provinces of Quebec and Ontario. In the aftermath of the American Revolution, the British authorities split the Province of Canada in 1791 into two, Upper Canada for English settlers fleeing persecution in the United States and Lower Canada for the French (later, Ontario and Quebec, respectively). This was designed to accommodate Loyalists who had fled post-war reprisals and persecution in the new United States, though the 5,000 English-speaking settlers in the Eastern Township of Quebec were allowed to stay in the French-speaking area and many French settlers moved into Ontario, especially into Eastern Ontario. Along with the area's original inhabitants, this made the area a patchwork of intersecting ethnicities that would ultimately end up blending.

Cornwall and the surrounding area, originally called "Royal Settlement #2" and then "New Jamestown", was initially a rough place, and was largely left to its own devices by all levels of government.  According to contemporaneous reports, this bred a local culture of intense self-reliance.  Adding to this initial history of pragmatic entrepreneurialism, beginning very early with the founding of the city, provincial and federal governments have typically neglected the area, treating it as little more than a transit corridor, an attitude which reached its apogee when the St. Lawrence Seaway was smashed through the region in the late 1950s, allowing the Canadian and American national economies to permanently bypass the region, leaving it once again to become something of an economic backwater. From the beginning to the present day, those who remained in the region tended to be those who had the fortitude and energy to survive on their own, with little useful outside assistance.
The original 516 settlers arrived in Royal Township #2 with minimal supplies and faced years of hard work and possible starvation.  Upon their departure from military camps in Montreal, Pointe Claire, Saint Anne, and Lachine in the fall of 1784, Loyalists were given a tent, one month's worth of food rations, clothes, and agricultural provisions by regiment commanders.  They were promised one cow for every two families, an axe, and other necessary tools in the near future. For the next three years, bateaux (boat) crews delivered rations to the township, after which residents were left to fend for themselves.
The region's energetic spirit of enterprise and fortitude was well known in the 19th century.  David Thompson, the Welsh-Canadian explorer who mapped the Far West and was called the greatest land geographer in history, drew many of his traveling companions from Cornwall's rural hinterland, drawing on Scottish and native settlers, and himself lived in Williamstown.

More recently, Cornwall has seen an increase in the arrival of new immigrants, who tend to integrate and often fare better than immigrants in other parts of the country.

Administrative divisions

City
 Cornwall (separated)

Townships

 North Dundas
 North Glengarry
 North Stormont
 South Dundas
 South Glengarry
 South Stormont

The Akwesasne First Nations reserve is within the Stormont, Dundas, Glengarry census division but is independent of the county.

Historical counties
 Dundas County
 Glengarry County
 Stormont County

Demographics

As an upper-tier municipality that excludes the City of Cornwall, the United Counties had a population of 64,824 living in 25,580 of its 27,018 total dwellings in the 2011 Census, a 0.7% change from its 2006 population of 64,374.

Politics
The Warden is the head of County Council in SDG and is elected annually by council members.

Most of the United Counties, with the exception of North Glengarry, constitutes the federal and provincial electoral district of Stormont—Dundas—South Glengarry. North Glengarry is part of the electoral district of Glengarry—Prescott—Russell. Both districts are currently represented federally by Conservative MP Eric Duncan and Liberal MP Francis Drouin, and provincially by Conservative MPP Jim McDonell and Liberal MPP Amanda Simard in Glengarry—Prescott—Russell.

See also
 List of municipalities in Ontario
 Southern Ontario
 Census divisions of Ontario
 Transit Eastern Ontario operated under the authority of The North Glengarry Prescott Russell (NGPR) Transport Board''
 List of townships in Ontario
  List of secondary schools in Ontario § Stormont, Dundas and Glengarry United Counties

References

External links

 
United counties in Ontario